Gerald Douglas Savory (17 November 1909 – 9 February 1996) was an English writer and television producer specialising in comedies.

Biography
The son of Kenneth Douglas Savory and actress Grace Lane (1877–1956), he was educated at Bradfield College and worked as a stockbroker's clerk before turning to the stage (Hull Repertory Theatre Company 1931–33), first as an actor then a writer. His play George and Margaret, written while out of work as an actor, ran for two years at Wyndham's Theatre and a year at the Piccadilly. It then transferred to Broadway, where it ran for 86 performances, and was later filmed. His earliest work in the film industry was as a dialogue writer for director Alfred Hitchcock's Young and Innocent (1937).

He lived in the USA in the 1940s and 50s writing for film and television, and became an American citizen. After returning to England in the mid 1950s he became a writer, producer and production manager for Granada Television, producing five episodes of ITV Play of the Week; adapting  Saki, J.B. Priestley, Noël Coward and Tennessee Williams for television. He then joined BBC Television, first as Head of Serials, then Head of Plays. He produced five episodes of the unsuccessful series Churchill's People (1975–76) and six of the eight episodes of Love in a Cold Climate (1980) for Thames Television.

Personal life
Savory was married four times but had no children other than a stepson by his fourth wife. His first marriage, to writer Teo Dunbar, ended in divorce. In 1950, he married American actress Althea Murphy (1916–1952), who died of leukemia in 1952. In 1953, he married actress Annette Carell, who died by suicide in 1967. He was survived by his fourth wife, actress Sheila Brennan, whom he married in 1970.

He died in England on 9 February 1996.

Plays
George and Margaret 1937 (377 performances in the West End, filmed in 1940)
Hand in Glove 1944 with Charles K. Freeman based on his own novel Hughie Roddis
A Likely Tale 1957
A Month of Sundays 1957
So Many Children 1959
Cup and Saucer 1961
Twinkling of an Eye 1965

Novels
Hughie Roddis 1942
Behold This Dreamer 1943

Television
Count Dracula 1977
Mapp and Lucia, Series One 1985; Series Two 1986

References

External links

1909 births
1996 deaths
English television producers
20th-century English novelists
20th-century English dramatists and playwrights
British male dramatists and playwrights
English male novelists
20th-century English male writers